Nattamai is a 1994 Indian Tamil-language drama film directed by K. S. Ravikumar. It starred Sarathkumar, Meena and Khushbu. The film was released on 2 November 1994, during Diwali, and completed a 175-day run at the box office. It is considered to be one of the most popular Tamil films of the 1990s and in general. It became a trendsetter for many films in later years. The Goundamani-Senthil comic duo was one of the most popular aspects of the film.

Sarathkumar earned both the Tamil Nadu State Film Award for Best Actor and Filmfare Award for Best Actor – Tamil for his performance in the film. The film was later remade in Telugu as Pedarayudu, in Hindi as Bulandi and in Kannada as Simhadriya Simha (2000).

Plot 

Shanmugam (Sarathkumar) is the village head, fondly called Nattamai in his village in Coimbatore. He is the Chair of the Village Administration and also the unofficial judge in the village meetings, a post his family has held for generations in his village to do justice. He hears all the cases and gives solutions to the people and even punishments to the wrongdoers. His wife Lakshmi (Khushbu) admires and respects him. His brothers Pasupathi (Sarathkumar) and Selvaraj (Raja Ravindra) fear him but also have a lot of respect for him as he has brought them up as his children. Pasupathi marries Meena (Meena), the daughter of an industrialist (Vinu Chakravarthy). She dislikes Shanmugam Nattamai because of his verdicts and attitude and her husband for being so timid with his brother but later transforms after learning of the former's greatness from her father. Selvaraj loves his paternal cousin, who is his paternal aunt (Manorama) granddaughter Kanmani (Sanghavi).

In the flashback, Periya Nattamai (Vijayakumar), Shanmugam Nattamai's, Pasupathi, and Selvaraj's father, orders Manorama's son (and Kanmani's father) (Ponnambalam)  to marry his servant's daughter whom he raped. Manorama (who is Periya Nattamai's sister) had met him the previous day, to ask for a false judgement in favor of her son. However, she was told strictly to not interfere with the judgments. His brother-in-law, (Ponnambalam's father and Manorama husband (Erode Soundar), shoots him as he is disappointed by his verdict. Enraged, Periya Nattamai gives his final judgment before dying. He expellees Ponnambalam's family from the village and makes Shanmugam the new Nattamai, before dying.

Years later, Ponnambalam's father dies. Ponnambalam builds envy on his uncle's family and waits for an opportunity to take revenge on them. He hires a woman as the village school teacher and asks her to make Pasupathi fall for her. She does so to save her father, who is in the hands of Ponnambalam. He kills her and makes the villagers believe that Pasupathi has committed the murder. Shanmugam Nattamai sentences ten years of exile for Pasupathi, and his wife Meena. Ponnambalam learns of his daughter's love for Selvaraj and tries to kill him, with the help of his goons. Pasupathi goes to his rescue of him, and a pregnant Meena goes to Shanmugam to convey this message. While Pasupathi starts to take revenge on Ponnambalam, Manorama rushes to Shanmugam, kills her son Ponnambalam, and reveals the truth and tells that he punished his brother without committing any mistake and also told that the crimes blamed on Pasupathi were really perpetrated by Ponnambalam. Shanmugam dies upon learning that he gave a wrong judgment, and Pasupathi is shown taking his place as the new Nattamai.

Cast 

 Sarathkumar as Nattamai (Shanmugam) and Pasupathy (dual role)
 Meena as Meena
 Khushbu as Lakshmi
 Raja Ravindra as Selvaraj
 Manorama as Nattamai's paternal aunt
 Sanghavi as Kanmani
 Goundamani as Nattamai's paternal cousin/ Mangalam
 Senthil as Nattamai's paternal uncle
 Ponnambalam as Nattamai's paternal cousin
 Pandu as Nattamai's assistant
 Vinu Chakravarthy as Meena's Father
 Vaishnavi as Ponnambalam's wife
 Rani as the teacher
 Erode Soundar as Nattamai's paternal aunt's husband
 S. P. Rajkumar as deaf man
 Kovai Senthil
 Master Mahendran
 Crane Manohar
 Vijayakumar as Periya Nattamai (Shanmugam, Pasupathy and Selvaraj's father) (special appearance)
 Kanal Kannan as Silambam player (special appearance)

Production 
Director K. S. Ravikumar initially approached Mammootty to play the supporting role played by vijayakumar. For reasons unknown, he declined the offer. Sarathkumar was then signed for as the lead. The film became the fourth collaboration between Ravikumar and Sarathkumar. When Ravikumar approached Khushbu for Nattamai's wife role, she hesitated as in most part of the film she had to look old, except in a brief flashback. She asked him whom he will cast if she denies, Ravikumar said he will approach veteran actress Lakshmi; this made Kusbhoo to take up this role. Mahendran was introduced as child artist through this film. Vijayakumar was initially cast as the elder brother, but a few days before shooting began, Ravikumar decided to have Sarathkumar play both brothers and Bharathiraja was Ravikumar's initial choice for the character of Vijayakumar.

Controversy 
In his early days as an actor, Sarathkumar was considered to be close to AIADMK supremo Jayalalithaa. However, Sarath's proximity to Jayalalithaa landed him in deep trouble when Nattamai, which was still running in Tamil Nadu theatres, was aired by Jayalalithaa's television channel JJ TV, using a U-matic tape, which Sarathkumar gave her for personal viewing at her residence. What the understanding between Jayalalithaa and Sarathkumar was not clear. However, this caused a furore in the film industry as the producer R. B. Choudary threatened action against Sarathkumar for misusing a tape given to him for personal viewing. An embarrassed Sarathkumar explained that he was taken by surprise and that he never expected Jayalalithaa to give it to the channel for telecast. He sought an explanation from both Jayalalitha and JJ TV, but without success. The ruling party reacted predictably, using every forum to attack Sarathkumar.

Soundtrack 
Soundtrack was composed by Sirpy and lyrics were written by Vairamuthu.

Release and reception
Nattamai was released on 2 November 1994, during Diwali. The Indian Express wrote that there was "never a dull moment" in the film. Thulasi of Kalki noted "Manorama and Vinu Chakravarthy for sentiment, Sangavi for glamour; Vaishnavi to cry; Ponnambalam to get thrashed and die. As usual, Sirpy's music makes you listen to it again and again even if you remember hearing it somewhere. Comedy as usual" and concluded "Why is that Tamil cinema hero has to be portrayed as a superman even if he's a villager". It became a blockbuster and completed a 175-day run at the box office.

Legacy 
The success of the film prompted Super Good Films, K. S. Ravikumar, Erode Soundar and Sarathkumar to announce a film titled Paamaran soon after. However, the project was later stalled owing to a fallout between the actor and the director. Despite discussions for director Vikraman to take over the film, the project was stalled.

Owing to its success, Nattamai was remade in Telugu as Pedarayudu (1995), It was remade in Kannada as Simhadriya Simha (2001). It was also remade in Hindi as Bulandi (2000).

The tagline Nattamai, theerpa maathi sollu (Chieftain, change your judgement) became popular after release. It became a trendsetter for many films in later years. The success of the film inspired similar themes about village chieftain. Vijayakumar's portrayal of village chieftain received critical acclaim and he went on to be typecasted with similar characters in later films. The film gave breakthrough in the career of Sarathkumar and the actor did similar films – Suryavamsam (1997), Natpukkaga (1998), Maayi (2000), Diwan (2003) and Ayyaa (2005) which featured him in double roles in the backdrop of village.

In popular culture 
Nattamai has been parodied and referenced many times. In a comedy scene from Aahaa Enna Porutham (1998), Goundamani mocks at the superstitions of village panchayat saying that chieftain should have assistant tagging along with him and should have a pot of water. Comedian Vivek has parodied this aspect in many films. He did a similar spoof in Sandai (2008) and Thoondil (2008) and made fun of village rituals in Kadhal Sadugudu (2003). Scenes from the film was parodied in Shiva starrer Thamizh Padam (2010), Ponnambalam who did the negative role in the original film had appeared as village chieftain in this film.

References

External links 
 

1990s Tamil-language films
1994 drama films
1994 films
Films directed by K. S. Ravikumar
Films scored by Sirpy
Indian drama films
Tamil films remade in other languages
Twins in Indian films
Films shot in Coimbatore
Super Good Films films